The 1963 Yale Bulldogs football team represented Yale University in the 1963 NCAA University Division football season.  The Bulldogs were led by first-year head coach John Pont, played their home games at the Yale Bowl and finished fourth in the Ivy League with a 4–3 record, 6–3 overall.  The November 23 game against Harvard was postponed to November 30 due to the assassination of President Kennedy on November 22.

Schedule

References

Yale
Yale Bulldogs football seasons
Yale Bulldogs football